Frafjord may refer to:

Places
Frafjord, a village in Gjesdal municipality, Rogaland county, Norway
Frafjorden, a fjord in Rogaland county, Norway
Frafjord Tunnel, a tunnel in Gjesdal municipality, Rogaland county, Norway

People
Marit Malm Frafjord, a Norwegian handball player who currently plays for Larvik HK
Hilde Frafjord Johnson, a Norwegian politician from the Christian Democratic Party